Extraordinary People was a television documentary series produced by Granada Television and broadcast on the ITV network in the United Kingdom between 10 March 1992 and 23 March 1993. Each programme focused on an individual or group of people who excel in their chosen field.

The programme ran for two series, with seven episodes in total.

Episode list

References

BFI Film & TV Database - Extraordinary People

1992 British television series debuts
1993 British television series endings
1990s British documentary television series
ITV documentaries
Television series by ITV Studios
Television shows produced by Granada Television
British television documentaries
English-language television shows